The Washington Stealth are a lacrosse team based in Everett, Washington. The team plays in the National Lacrosse League (NLL). The 2013 season was the fourth season in Washington, and the 14th in franchise history. It was also the final season the team played in Washington, as they were relocated to Langley, BC for the 2014 season.

After a terrible 2012 season that saw only four wins, the Stealth rebounded in 2013, winning three of their first four games on their way to a 9–7 record. They tied with the Calgary Roughnecks for the best record in the West, but were seeded second due to tiebreakers. In the playoffs, the Stealth defeated the Edmonton Rush and Calgary Roughnecks to advance to the Championship game for the third year in the last four.

The Stealth earned the right to host the Championship game, but the Comcast Arena was booked, so the game was moved to the Langley Events Centre in Langley, British Columbia. The Rochester Knighthawks defeated the Stealth 11–10 to win their second straight Championship.

Regular season

Conference standings

Game log
Reference:

Playoffs

Game log

Roster

Transactions

Trades

Entry Draft
The 2012 NLL Entry Draft took place on October 1, 2012. The Stealth made the following selections:

See also
2013 NLL season

References

Washington
Washington Stealth seasons
2013 in sports in Washington (state)